The Honda CBR250F is a CBR series  four-cylinder sport bike made by Honda. The CBR250F was first sold in Japan in 1986. The CBR250RR MC22 was discontinued in 1996 in Japan, but sales continued in Australia until 2000



Overview 
The CBR250F aka CBR250 Four was made in 1986. Motorcycle racing was popular at the time, with the Japanese Grand Prix and Suzuka 8 Hours drawing large crowds. Licensing restrictions in Japan also caused small displacement motorcycles to have a bulk of the motorcycle sales. Thus, the CBR250F sport bike was born. Other Japanese manufacturers would also design 250cc 4 cylinder sport bikes, such as the Suzuki GSX-R250, Yamaha FZR250, and Kawasaki ZXR250.

Specifications

References 
Honda cbr 250rr 

CBR250F
Sport bikes
Motorcycles introduced in 1986